Castleknock  is a railway station that serves the suburban centres of Castleknock and Blanchardstown in Fingal, Ireland.

Description

The station is parallel to the Royal Canal near the 12th lock. It has two through platforms. It originally featured a portacabin booking office; however, a permanent station building was constructed (and the platforms lengthened) as part of the upgrade of the Western Commuter service in 2000. The ticket office is open from 06:30 AM to 13:00 PM, Monday to Friday. It is closed on Saturday and Sunday.

The station was further upgraded in 2012 with new shelters and signage.

History
The station opened on 2 July 1990.

See also 
 List of railway stations in Ireland
 Rail transport in Ireland

References

External links 

 Irish Rail Castleknock Station Website

Iarnród Éireann stations in Fingal
Railway stations opened in 1990
1990 establishments in Ireland
Castleknock
Railway stations in Fingal
Railway stations in the Republic of Ireland opened in the 20th century